Derry Power (born 1935) is an Irish actor born in Dublin. He appeared in the first production of Brendan Behan's The Quare Fellow at Dublin's Pike Theatre in 1954.  He is best known for playing management genius Seamus Finnegan in the BBC Television sitcom The Fall and Rise of Reginald Perrin, with the classic line "Would you be having a joke there with a simple, tongue-tied Irishman from the land of the bogs and the little people?". In a long stage career he has featured in many plays in the Abbey Theatre; he has appeared in TV series from Z-Cars to Ballykissangel and in many films made in Ireland.

During early 2016 he starred with Des Keogh in The Quiet Land by Bairbre Ni Chaoimh at Bewley's Theatre Café, Dublin.

Derry also appeared in Super Gran as the fabulous o Finnegan (1985)

Selected filmography
 Never Put It in Writing (1964)
 Underground (1970)
 Warlords of Atlantis (1978)
 Educating Rita (1983)
 Rawhead Rex (1986)
 My Left Foot (1989)
 Far and Away (1992)
 Disco Pigs (2001)
 The Tiger's Tail (2006)

External links

Irish male television actors
1935 births
Living people
Place of birth missing (living people)